In accelerator physics, rigidity is the effect of particular magnetic fields on the motion of the charged particles.

It is a measure of the momentum of the particle, and it refers to the fact that a higher momentum particle will have a higher resistance to deflection by a magnetic field. It is defined as R = Bρ = pc/q, where B is the magnetic field, ρ is the gyroradius of the particle due to this field, p is the particle momentum, c is the speed of light and q is its charge. It is frequently referred to as simply "Bρ".

The unit of the rigidity R is volts(N·m/C), a convenient unit is GV (109 V). In this case, unit of B is T(N·s/C·m), ρ is in the unit rad/s, p is in the unit kg· m/s, c is in the unit m/s, q is in the unit C.

The rigidity is defined by the action of a static magnetic field, whose direction is perpendicular to the velocity vector of the particle.  This will cause a force perpendicular both to the velocity vector, and to the field, defining a plane through which the particle moves.  The definition of the Lorentz force implies that the particle's motion will be circular in a uniform field, thus giving a constant radius of curvature.

If the particle momentum, p, is given in GeV/c, then the rigidity, in tesla-metres, is Bρ = 3.3356pc/q.

References

Accelerator physics